Gabaston is a commune in the Pyrénées-Atlantiques department in south-western France.

Population

Hydrography 
  
Gabaston is watered by the Gabas river which flows through the town. The river was known as the fluvius gavasensis in 982.

Notable Personalities 
Piers Gaveston (vers 1282-1312), Gascon knight, favorite of King Edward II of England.

See also
Communes of the Pyrénées-Atlantiques department

References

Communes of Pyrénées-Atlantiques